The Lerner Theatre, previously known as the Elco Theatre, is a historic theatre located at Elkhart, Elkhart County, Indiana, United States. It was built in 1924, and is a two-story, reinforced concrete and steel, Beaux-Arts style building.  The front facade features four Corinthian order columns, three freestanding urns, enriched cornice, parapet and frieze.  The building is faced with terra cotta and has a lighted canopy projecting over the sidewalk.  The auditorium features a large central dome measuring 30 to 40 feet in diameter.  Built as a vaudeville theatre, by the late 1920s it had evolved into a motion picture palace.

It was added to the National Register of Historic Places in 1980. It is located in the Elkhart Downtown Commercial Historic District.

References

Theatres on the National Register of Historic Places in Indiana
Beaux-Arts architecture in Indiana
Theatres completed in 1924
Buildings and structures in Elkhart, Indiana
National Register of Historic Places in Elkhart County, Indiana
1924 establishments in Indiana
Historic district contributing properties in Indiana